Anna Goryachova (born 10 December 1983) is a Russian operatic mezzo-soprano, known especially for her interpretations of bel canto operas.

Career

Anna Goryachova started her studies as a pianist. In 2008 she became a soloist of the St. Petersburg Chamber Opera.

In 2012 Goryachova made her debut at the Rossini Opera Festival in Pesaro, where she sang Edoardo in Matilde di Shabran, with partners like Juan Diego Flórez and Olga Peretyatko, conducted by Michele Mariotti and directed by Mario Martone. She returned to the Rossini Opera Festival a year after, when she portrayed Isabella in L'italiana in Algeri staged by Davide Livermore.

Goryachova has been a soloist of the Zürich Opera until the 2016/17 season.

In 2014 Goryachova made her Paris Opera debut at the Palais Garnier as Ruggiero in Handel's Alcina, conducted by Christophe Rousset and at the Teatro Comunale di Bologna as Dorabella in Mozart's Così fan tutte, conducted by Michele Mariotti and directed by Daniele Abbado. 2015 has seen Goryachova making her debut in Amsterdam, at the National Opera. In 2016 she sang Adalgisa in Bellini's Norma at the Teatro Lirico Giuseppe Verdi in Trieste and Teatro San Carlo in Naples and she sang once again at the Amsterdam National Opera, Polina in Tchaikovsky's The Queen of Spades, staged by Stefan Herheim and conducted by Mariss Jansons.

In 2017 she made her debut in the title role of Rossini's La Cenerentola at the Oslo Opera, then she sang Alcina in Haydn's Orlando paladino and Rosina in Rossini's Il barbiere di Siviglia at the Zürich Opera, before portraying again Melibea in Il viaggio a Reims at the Teatro dell'Opera di Roma.

Repertoire (partial)

Personal life
Goryachova is married to the Italian baritone Simone Alberghini; they have one child.

Prizes
2009: Nomination for Best Female Role (Donna Elvira) at Golden Mask, Moscow

Recordings

DVD 
Rossini, Matilde di Shabran – Florez/Peretyatko/Goryachova – Mariotti/Martone – DECCA
Rossini, L'italiana in Algeri – Goryachova/Esposito/Shi – Encinar/Livermore – OPUS ARTE

References

External links

Operabase
Biography, Royal Opera House, London
Bibliothèque nationale de France

Living people
1983 births
Russian mezzo-sopranos
Operatic mezzo-sopranos
21st-century Russian women opera singers
Singers from Saint Petersburg
Saint Petersburg Conservatory alumni
Accademia Nazionale di Santa Cecilia alumni